Lady Green is a hamlet half a mile east of Ince Blundell, in Sefton, Merseyside, England. It is a traditional grouping of farm buildings built on medieval footings.

Towns and villages in the Metropolitan Borough of Sefton